Herman J. Witasek (October 16, 1913 – July 25, 1963) was an American professional basketball player. He played for the Oshkosh All-Stars in the National Basketball League (NBL) from 1937 to 1942 and averaged 5.1 points per game. He won the NBL championships in 1941 but was not on the All-Stars playoffs roster in 1942 when they won a second championship.

References

1913 births
1963 deaths
American men's basketball players
Basketball players from North Dakota
Forwards (basketball)
Guards (basketball)
North Dakota Fighting Hawks men's basketball players
Oshkosh All-Stars players